Cock and Bull is a 2016 Chinese crime comedy drama film directed by Cao Baoping and starring Liu Ye, Zhang Yi, Duan Bowen, Wang Ziwen, Tan Zhuo, Wang Yanhui, Yan Bei and Sun Lei. It was released in China on September 14, 2016.

Synopsis
Three interlocking stories revolve around a murder in a small town in Southeast China.  A local mechanic, known for his honesty, comes under suspicion from the police.  A young, unemployed man has been seen with the victim's scooter.  And the boyfriend of a bar hostess has been hanging around the town.

Cast
Liu Ye
Zhang Yi
Duan Bowen
Wang Ziwen
Tan Zhuo
Wang Yanhui
Yan Bei
Sun Lei

Reception
The film has grossed  at the Chinese box office.

Awards and nominations

References

External links
 Cock & Bull (2016) at Fandango
 Cock (2016) at Rotten Tomatoes
 Cock & Bull (2016) at moviefone

Chinese crime comedy-drama films
2010s crime comedy-drama films
Huaxia Film Distribution films
Films directed by Cao Baoping